The battle of Ivankiv was a military engagement that was part of the Kyiv offensive in the 2022 Russian invasion of Ukraine for control of the town of Ivankiv which is the location of a key crossing over the river Teteriv. The combatants were elements of the Russian Armed Forces and Ukrainian Ground Forces. The battle lasted from 25 February 2022 to 31 March 2022 and ended with the withdrawal of Russian forces. The battle was part of a larger tactic to encircle Kyiv, the capital city of Ukraine. While Russian forces captured the village on 27 February, the armed forces of Ukraine resisted the Russian advance in the capital's western suburbs of Irpin, Bucha, and Hostomel.

Battle
In the early morning of 25 February 2022, Russian forces approached Ivankiv from the northeast after making a breakthrough in the Battle of Chernobyl. Ukrainian forces destroyed the bridge crossing the Teteriv River at Ivankiv, halting the advance of Russian tanks heading towards Kyiv. Ukrainian airborne assault troops engaged Russian soldiers at Ivankiv and the nearby village of Dymer. Among reported Russian units involved was the 5th Separate Guards Tank Brigade, losing some vehicles.

Some Russian forces were able to break through Ivankiv and captured the strategically significant Antonov Airport after a skirmish.

Fighting in Ivankiv continued into the afternoon and evening of 25 February, with Russian forces shelling the town with artillery, causing some civilian casualties. Ivankiv is also the location of a major gas pipeline, which if destroyed could halt the transfer of Ukrainian gas to much of Europe.

On 26 February, fighting in Ivankiv continued and on 27 February, the Ivankiv Historical and Local History Museum was destroyed by Russian forces during the battle, with the loss of over twenty works by Ukrainian artist Maria Prymachenko. In response, the Ukrainian Minister of Culture, Olexandr Tkachenko, requested that Russia lose its UNESCO membership.

The capture of Ivankiv by Russian forces was confirmed on 2 March.

Aftermath 
On 31 March, Ukrainian forces retook control of Ivankiv and Dymer following a withdrawal by the Russian military from the town.

References 

Ivankiv
History of Kyiv Oblast
Kyiv offensive (2022)